Dennis Hampson may refer to:

Sir Dennis Hampson, 3rd Baronet (d. 1719), of the Hampson Baronets, MP for Wycombe
Sir Dennys Francis Hampson, 11th Baronet (1897–1939), of the Hampson Baronets
Denis Hampson, Irish harper